This is an incomplete list (10+ years old) of many of the breweries in Canada. Breweries are not included in this list unless the individual brewery is notable or contains significance to Canadian culture and history.

Breweries in Canada

See also

 Beer and breweries by region
 Beer in Canada
 Beer in Quebec
 Canadian Breweries
 List of breweries in British Columbia
 List of breweries, wineries, and distilleries in Manitoba
 List of breweries in Quebec

References

Further reading 
 Acker, Caroline J; and Sarah W. Tracy (2004). Altering American Consciousness: The History of Alcohol and Drug Use in the United States, 1800-2000. Amherst, Mass: University of Massachusetts Press, Print. 
 Mancall, Peter C. (1995). Deadly Medicine: Indians and Alcohol in Early America. Ithaca: Cornell University Press, Print.

Notes

Sources 
 The Brewed Awakening guide to B.C.’s new breweries in 2016
 "Breweries in Québec, Canada", in Beer Me!, 2008

External links 
 http://breweriesontheweb.com/CA.htm

 
Canadian cuisine-related lists
Canada
Breweries